Playthings of Destiny is a 1921 American romance film directed by Edwin Carewe and written by Anthony Paul Kelly. The film stars Anita Stewart, Herbert Rawlinson, Walter McGrail, Grace Morse, William V. Mong, and Richard Headrick. The film was released in May 1921, by Associated First National Pictures.

Cast       
Anita Stewart as Julie Arnold
Herbert Rawlinson as Geoffrey Arnold
Walter McGrail as Hubert Randolph
Grace Morse as Claire
William V. Mong as Conklin
Richard Headrick as Julie's child

References

External links

 
 
 lantern slide

1921 films
American romance films
1920s romance films
First National Pictures films
Films directed by Edwin Carewe
American silent feature films
American black-and-white films
1920s English-language films
1920s American films